Jack Burns (6 October 1918 – 24 August 1995) was an Australian rules footballer who played with Collingwood in the Victorian Football League (VFL).

Notes

External links 

Profile from Collingwood Forever

1918 births
1995 deaths
Australian rules footballers from Victoria (Australia)
Collingwood Football Club players
Ivanhoe Amateurs Football Club players